LOTAR Eilat (in hebrew: לוט״ר אילת) is an IDF special force unit whose mission is to protect the safety of the residents and tourists of Eilat against terrorism and is also specialized in hostage rescue operations. Unlike the other units within the Israeli army, Lotar Eilat is made up of reservists between the ages of 20 and 60 who live in southern Israel and volunteer to protect their city. In their regular service in the army, they were part of different elite units, and afterwards they take advantage of their training and experience to be part of this special operations team.

City
Eilat is one of the most visited cities in Israel. Every day a large number of buses loaded with tourists from other countries of the world come to visit the beaches and the hotels of this southern Israeli city. Due to its remoteness to the major urban centers of the country, and its proximity to the borders between Israel-Egypt and Israel-Jordan, that makes of this city a very prone and vulnerable place to terrorist attacks that may alter the tranquility of the zone. This is the reason why the LOTAR Eilat Unit was created.

Because the city is far from the center of the country, an immediate counter-terror force is needed, and the Unity members always must be ready for action. At the moment when they are needed, they have to leave everything what they are doing and join the unit.

The time they have to arrive is very short, so they must respond to the calls as soon as they can. Once the alarm goes off, they only have seven minutes to get to a certain place, and then another seven additional minutes to put on their uniforms and equipment. That makes a total of 14 minutes. They can proceed fast thanks to the fact that several times a year, these men meet to perform drills and train for an eventual situation.

History
In 1989, the unit carried out its first operation, when a Jordanian soldier entered Kibbutz Lotan, kidnapping a hostage. The LOTAR Eilat team responded to the incident, and carried out a successful raid on the house, neutralizing the Jordanian soldier and releasing the hostage.

In September 1995, an Iranian passenger plane was hijacked by an emotionally disturbed individual. The unit handled the incident successfully and after the negotiations the hijacker was delivered without causing major damage.

Five years later, a hijacker took control of a plane in Dagestan heading to Moscow along with fifty of its passengers, with a fake bomb. The plane landed and the kidnapper surrendered. The Yamam unit also participated in this operation.

In October 2000, the Lotar unit was needed in a variety of operations, due to constant clashes during the Second Intifada conflict.

Recent times
In recent times, the Lotar unit has taken part in a famous episode in a hotel in the city of Eilat, where a US citizen who was employed at the same hotel opened fire against the people, causing the death of a person and he afterwards took refuge in one of the hotel rooms. The agents attempted to negotiate to make him surrender, but because of the attacker's resistance and his continuous shots, the forces were forced to open fire on him because he had aroused the panic among a large number of hotel guests who were resting there during the holiday of Succot.

Due to how they perform in training and the success of their operations, LOTAR Eilat is among the special forces units of the Israel Defense Forces, together with other units like Sayeret Matkal or Shayetet 13.

References 

Special forces of Israel